The 1894–95 season was the third in the history of the Bristol & District League, which was renamed the Western League the following season.

Hereford Thistle were the Division One champions in their debut season, but they left the league at the end of the season. Warmley Reserves won Division Two for the second year in succession.

Division One
Two new clubs joined Division One for this season, increasing the number of clubs from ten to 12.
Hereford Thistle
Swindon Wanderers

Division Two
Two new teams joined Division Two this season, increasing the number of clubs from ten to 11 after Trowbridge Town Reserves left.
Staple Hill Reserves
Willsbridge, from the South Bristol & District League

St Paul's finished as runners-up in Division Two, and were elected to Division One for the following season ahead of Warmley Reserves as Warmley's first team were already playing in the top level.

References

 

1894-95
1894–95 in English association football leagues